Arnold Page Rutherford (2 September 1892 – 23 July 1980) was an English first-class cricketer. Rutherford was a right-handed batsman who bowled right-arm medium pace.

Rutherford represented Hampshire in one first-class match in 1912 against Cambridge University.

Rutherford died in Weybridge, Surrey on 23 July 1980.

Family
Rutherford's brother John Rutherford also represented Hampshire, playing in eight first-class matches.

External links
Arnold Rutherford at Cricinfo
Arnold Rutherford at CricketArchive

1892 births
1980 deaths
People from Highclere
English cricketers
Hampshire cricketers
People from Weybridge